The Bust of Auguste Rodin is a totemic portrait originally moulded in clay in 1909 by the French artist Antoine Bourdelle. The artist's teacher and associate, Auguste Rodin, is portrayed as a sacred icon with the visage and horns of Michelangelo's Moses. A bronze cast of a modified version was displayed in the 1910 Salon de la Société Nationale des Beaux–Arts on the Champ de Mars along with his Hercules the Archer.

See also
Bust of Auguste Rodin (Claudel)

References

External links

1910 sculptures
Bronze sculptures
Sculptures by Antoine Bourdelle
Cultural depictions of Auguste Rodin